The 1980 season was Sydney City's fourth season in the National Soccer League. In addition to the domestic league, they also participated in the NSL Cup. Sydney City finished 1st in their National Soccer League season, and were eliminated in the NSL Cup quarter-finals by Brisbane Lions.

Players

Competitions

Overview

National Soccer League

League table

Results by round

Matches

Finals series

NSL Cup

Statistics

Appearances and goals
Players with no appearances not included in the list.

Clean sheets

References

Hakoah Sydney City East FC seasons